Tisis meliorella is a moth in the family Lecithoceridae. It was described by Francis Walker in 1864. It is found on Borneo and Sumatra.

Adults are chalybeous (steel blue), the forewings with an ochraceous costal stripe and with two ochraceous bands, the stripe decreasing in breadth from the base to the tip.

References

Moths described in 1864
Tisis